A cougar is a large cat species.

Cougar, The Cougar, Cougars or The Cougars may also refer to:

Bands
Cougar (band), an instrumental band from Madison, WI
Cougars (band), an indie rock band from Chicago, IL
The Cougars, a rock band from Bristol, UK

Characters
Cougar (comics), a superhero
Jean-Luc Cougar, the player character from the video game WinBack
Straight Cougar, a Japanese cartoon character

Computing
Windows Small Business Server 2008, server software codenamed "Cougar"
HP 100LX, a palmtop PC codenamed "Project Cougar"

People
Cougar Annie (1888–1983), pioneer of British Columbia
John Mellencamp (born 1951), American rock musician with the former stage names "Johnny Cougar", "John Cougar" and "John Cougar-Mellencamp"

Places
Cougar, Washington, an unincorporated community in Cowlitz County
Cougar Dam, a hydroelectric dam in Oregon
Cougar Reservoir, a reservoir in Oregon
Cougar Gulch, a valley in the state of Washington

Sports teams
BYU Cougars, the sports teams of Brigham Young University in Provo, Utah
College of Charleston Cougars
Houston Cougars, University of Houston Conference athletic teams
Kane County Cougars, minor league baseball team from Geneva, Illinois, USA
Keighley Cougars, rugby team from Keighley, West Yorkshire
Lübeck Cougars, American football team from Lübeck, Germany
Prince George Cougars, junior ice hockey team from Prince George, British Columbia, Canada
Raleigh Cougars, USBL basketball team
Velez Cougars, the sports teams of Velez College in Cebu City, Philippines
Washington State Cougars, Washington State University athletic teams

Television
"Cougars" (30 Rock), a 2007 television episode
The Cougar (TV series), an American reality show
Cougar Club, a 2007 American film
Cougar Town, an American sitcom

Transport

Airplanes
Grumman F-9 Cougar, an American naval jet fighter
Gulfstream American GA-7 Cougar, a twin-engined light aircraft

Automobiles
Ford Cougar, a European automobile release
Mercury Cougar, an automobile

Fighting vehicles
Cougar (vehicle), an armored military vehicle used by U.S. and British forces
AVGP Cougar, a Canadian armored fighting vehicle

Helicopters
Cougar Helicopters, a helicopter company
Eurocopter AS532 Cougar, a helicopter

Mass transportation
ACE Cougar, a bus

Ships
HMCS Cougar (Z15), a Royal Canadian Navy patrol vessel in commission from 1940 to 1945
 (previously Empire Cougar and other names), a cargo ship in service 1919–51

Other vehicles
Claas Cougar, a large self-propelled mower

Other uses
Cougar (slang), an older woman who dates much younger men
Cougar Energy, Australian energy company
Beretta Cougar, series of Beretta pistols
The Daily Cougar (formerly The Cougar), a student newspaper at the University of Houston
 Cougar (horse)

See also
Cougaar, a distributed multi-agent computer architecture